The Alantaya Taungdan (Alantaya Range) is a range of mountains or hills in Kayin State, in the southern part of the Burma (Myanmar). It is part of the Tenasserim Range.

See also
Tenasserim Hills

Notes

Mountain ranges of Myanmar